Route 54A may refer to:

New York State Route 54A, a state highway in New York, United States
Dublin Bus, a public transport operator in Ireland